Polly Ho-Yen is an English author who writes books for both younger and older children and has also written a novel for adults.

Biography
Ho-Yen was born in Northampton and grew up in Buckinghamshire. She studied English at the University of Birmingham and worked both in publishing and as a primary school teacher.

Her debut novel, The Boy In The Tower (2014), was shortlisted for the Blue Peter Book Award, the Federation of Children's Book Groups Book Award and the Waterstones Children’s Book Prize.

Her first adult novel, Dark Lullaby was published in 2021.

Ho-Yen is based in Bristol, where she set up the Bristol Teen Book Award for Bristol secondary schools.

Published works

For children

For adults

References

External links
 

Living people
English writers
English children's writers
21st-century English women writers
Writers from Buckinghamshire
Year of birth missing (living people)